Lot 45 is a township in Kings County, Prince Edward Island, Canada.  It is part of East Parish. Lot 45 was awarded to William Matthew Burt MP and John Callender in the 1767 land lottery.

References

45
Geography of Kings County, Prince Edward Island